Here We Are Again is the fourth album by the psychedelic rock band Country Joe and the Fish. It was released in 1969 with the US catalog number Vanguard VSD 79299. It peaked on the Billboard 200 at number 48, and stayed on the charts for eleven weeks. Only Country Joe McDonald and Melton remained from the original lineup that began breaking up since the previous album. The past members would appear as guest musicians however.

The songs were composed by Country Joe McDonald and Barry Melton. In addition to "Country Joe" McDonald (vocals, guitar) and Barry "The Fish" Melton (lead guitar, vocals), the founding members of the band—Gary "Chicken" Hirsh on drums and David Bennett Cohen on Hammond organ, piano and guitar—also played on the recording. The remaining instruments were played by Mark Ryan and President Flyer. For the first time ever, some titles were accompanied by string and brass, which gave the album a somewhat poppier character. The tracks "I'll Survive" and "Maria" were recorded at Vanguard Studios in 23rd Street, New York. The remaining compositions were recorded at Pacific High Studios in San Francisco.

A single from the album, "Here I Go Again"/"Baby, You're Driving Me Crazy", was released, but it did not place in the charts.

Track listing 
All tracks composed by Country Joe McDonald, except where indicated.
Side one
 "Here I Go Again" — 3:24
 "Donovan‘s Reef" — 4:18
 "It‘s So Nice to Have Love" — 3:25
 "Baby, You’re Driving Me Crazy" — (Barry Melton) — 2:43
 "Crystal Blues" — 6:18
Side two
 "For No Reason" — 3:55
 "I’ll Survive" — 2:28
 "Maria" — 3:30
 "My Girl" — (Melton) — 2:16
 "Doctor of Electricity" — (Melton) — 3:58

Personnel 
Country Joe and The Fish
 Country Joe McDonald — lead vocals (tracks 1-3, 5-8); harmony vocals (track 4), guitars
 Barry "The Fish" Melton — electric guitar (tracks 1-6, 9, 10), electric slide guitar (tracks 7, 8), backing vocals (tracks 1-3, 5, 6, 8), lead vocals (tracks 4, 9, 10)
 David Cohen — keyboards (tracks 1-5, 8-10)
 Gary "Chicken" Hirsh — drums, percussion (all tracks)
Additional Personnel
 Mark Ryan — bass (tracks 1, 2, 6)
 Jack Casady — bass (tracks 3-5, 9, 10)
 Peter Albin — bass (tracks 7, 8)
 Mark Kapner — piano (tracks 7, 8)

References

External links 
 William Ruhlmann in Allmusic
 Website of Country Joe McDonald

Country Joe and the Fish albums
1969 albums
Albums produced by Samuel Charters
Vanguard Records albums